Rodney Street in Liverpool, England, is noted for the number of doctors who practise there and its Georgian architecture. It is sometimes referred to as the "Harley Street of the North". Together with Hope Street and Gambier Terrace it forms the Rodney Street conservation area. There are over 60 Grade II listed buildings on the street and one Grade II* former church.

History

Rodney Street was laid out in 1783–1784 by William Roscoe and others. It was named after George Brydges Rodney, 1st Baron Rodney, who, in 1782, secured a naval victory over the Comte de Grasse at the Battle of the Saintes. It was developed piecemeal up to the 1820s with houses for the affluent, escaping the old town centre. A few houses have five bays, with central doors, but most are three bays. They were erected in pairs or short runs by different developers which led to an inconsistent roof line.

Sometimes referred to in local media as the "Harley Street of the North", some buildings on Rodney Street are now used by doctors conducting private clinics, notably for cosmetic surgery.

Buildings

No. 9 was the birthplace of Arthur Clough, a poet born in 1819. No. 62 (built 1792–1793) was the birthplace in 1809 of William Ewart Gladstone, Prime Minister of the United Kingdom on four separate occasions through the 1860s to the 1890s, and the home of his father John. No. 59 Rodney Street was home and studio to photographer Edward Chambré Hardman from 1947 to 1988, and his wife, business partner and fellow photographer, Margaret until her death in 1969., and is now owned by the National Trust and open to the public. On the north side of Rodney Street stands the disused Scottish Presbyterian Church of Saint Andrew, built in 1823–1824. The body of the church is of a simple two-storey design with round arched windows and stuccoed walls designed by Daniel Stewart. The façade of blackened ashlar, designed by John Foster Jr., is an imposing composition of Ionic entrance columns, flanked by corner towers, topped with Corinthian columns and domes. In 2012, the former church was renovated and redeveloped to provide en suite student accommodation for 100 students.

Notable residents
Henry Booth merchant, entrepreneur, and engineer
Arthur Hugh Clough and Anne Clough were born in the street
William Henry Duncan, appointed as Liverpool's first Medical Officer of Health in 1847
William Ewart Gladstone was born at number 62
E. Chambré Hardman, photographer, studio at no 59
Nicholas Monsarrat, novelist, was born on the street.
William Roscoe, developer and historian
James Maury, the first United States consul from 1790 to 1829, lived at 4 Rodney Street
Brian Epstein, manager of The Beatles, was born at no 4 Rodney Street in 1934

See also
 Architecture of Liverpool
 Grade II listed buildings in Liverpool-L1
 Grade II* listed buildings in Liverpool – City Centre

References
Notes

Citations

Further reading

External links

Rodney Street conservation area
 Liverpool - History - People
88 Rodney Street Website

Buildings and structures in Liverpool
Streets in Liverpool
1783 establishments in England